Chandlerville is an unincorporated community in Johnson County, Kentucky, United States. It is at an elevation of 860 feet (262 m). Chandlerville's ZIP code is 41257.

References

Unincorporated communities in Johnson County, Kentucky
Unincorporated communities in Kentucky